Las Nutrias is an unincorporated community and census-designated place in Socorro County, New Mexico, United States. Its population was 149 as of the 2010 census. New Mexico State Road 304 passes through the community.

Geography

Demographics

Education
Its school district is Belén Consolidated Schools. Belén High School is the district's comprehensive high school.

Gallery

References

Census-designated places in New Mexico
Census-designated places in Socorro County, New Mexico